This is a list of people who have served as His Majesty's Lord-Lieutenant for the County of Berwick.

List of officeholders
 Alexander, Earl of Home 17 March 1794 – 20 October 1841
 James, Earl of Lauderdale 2 November 1841 – 22 August 1860
 David, Lord Marjoribanks 10 December 1860 – 19 June 1873
 James, Duke of Roxburghe 9 July 1873 – 23 April 1879
 Charles, Earl of Home 20 June 1879 – 1890
 Frederick, Earl of Lauderdale 4 March 1890 – 1901
 Lieutenant-Colonel George, Lord Binning 5 January 1901 – 12 January 1917
 Captain Charles Barrington Balfour 30 May 1917 – 31 August 1921
 Colonel Charles Hope 23 January 1922 – 25 August 1930
 Charles, Earl of Home 8 December 1930 – 11 July 1951
 George, Earl of Haddington 11 January 1952 – 1969
 Lieutenant-Colonel Sir William Bertram Swan 13 October 1969 – 1989
 Major-General Sir John Swinton of Kimmerghame  10 October 1989 – 2000
 Major Alexander Richard Trotter 20 September 2000 – 20 February 2014
 Jeanna Swan  25 April 2014 – present

Deputy lieutenant of Berwickshire
A deputy lieutenant of Berwickshire is commissioned by the Lord Lieutenant of Berwickshire. Deputy lieutenants support the work of the lord-lieutenant. There can be several deputy lieutenants at any time, depending on the population of the county. Their appointment does not terminate with the changing of the lord-lieutenant, but they usually retire at age 75.

22 May 2006: Joy Dobie
22 May 2006: Susan Swan

References

Lord Lieutenancies of Scotland
Berwickshire